Wembley Light Maintenance Depot is a traction maintenance depot located in Wembley, London, England. The depot is situated on the Chiltern Main Line and is east of Wembley Stadium station.

Allocation 
As of 2017, the depot's allocation consists of 
Class 68 locomotives, driving van trailers, Class 165 Networkers, and Class 168 Clubman.

References 

 Railway depots in England
Transport in the London Borough of Brent
Wembley